Wasantha Yapa Bandara is a  Sri Lankan politician and a member of the Sri Lankan parliament from Kandy Electoral District as a member of the Sri Lanka Podujana Peramuna.

References

Sri Lanka Podujana Peramuna politicians
Living people
Sri Lankan Buddhists
Members of the 16th Parliament of Sri Lanka
Year of birth missing (living people)